The 2022–23 División de Honor was the 56th season of the División de Honor, the top flight of  Spanish domestic rugby union.

Competition format

The season takes place between October and May.  

Points are awarded as follows:  
4 points for a win
2 points for a draw
1 bonus point is awarded to a team scoring 4 tries or more in a match
1 bonus point is awarded to a team that loses a match by 7 points or fewer

Each team plays twelve games - one game against each opponent. Then the league divides into two groups: the top six teams will progress to Group A and the remaining seven teams will progress to Group B. The teams play the other members of their groups once more, meaning Group A teams play a further five games and Group B teams play a further six.

As before, eight teams will progress through to the playoffs, meaning the top two teams from Group B will qualify along with the six teams from Group A.

As the division has an extra team, two teams will be automatically relegated (instead of one) and the team finishing eleventh will contest a playoff against the runner-up from the División B playoffs.

The division is made up of thirteen teams this season instead of the usual twelve after controversy during the 2021-22 season.

La Vila and Gernika finished eleventh and twelfth in 2021-22, but Alcobendas were automatically relegated for fielding an ineligible player. This earned La Vila a reprieve from relegation. Initially, Gernika were set to be relegated, but they argued that Alcobendas' point reduction meant the Madrid side technically finished bottom, and that they were therefore denied their rightful opportunity to play off against the runner-up from the Division B playoffs, Belenos RC.  

The Spanish Rugby Federation ruled that denying either team - Gernika or Belenos - a place in the top flight would be unfair.

Promotion and relegation 
The second-tier División de Honor B is made up of three regional groups. The top eight teams across the three groups play off; the champion is promoted to División de Honor, at the expense of the team which finishes last in the División de Honor. 

The runner-up plays a further playoff against the team which finishes 11th in the top flight.

Teams
Alcobendas were relegated while Pozuelo and Belenos RC were promoted. Gernika were given a reprieve despite finishing bottom of the table last year, meaning the division grew to 13 members.

Current standings

Copa del Rey
The Copa del Rey's format was changed. 

The teams finishing in the top six after the first phase of the league qualify for the Copa del Rey. The team finishing third plays the team finishing sixth, while the team finishing fourth faces the team finishing fifth. The winners of these two games would progress to the semifinals, where they meet the top two.

References

External links
Official site

Rugby union in Spain
2021-22